Wendy is a given name now generally given to girls in English-speaking countries.

In Britain, Wendy appeared as a masculine name in a parish record in 1615. It was also used as a surname in Britain from at least the 17th century. Its popularity in Britain as a feminine name is owed to the character Wendy Darling from the 1904 play Peter Pan and its 1911 novelisation Peter and Wendy, both by J. M. Barrie. Its popularity reached a peak in the 1960s, and subsequently declined. The name was inspired by young Margaret Henley, daughter of Barrie's poet friend W. E. Henley. With the common childhood difficulty pronouncing Rs, Margaret reportedly used to call him "my fwiendy-wendy".

In Germany after 1986, the name Wendy became popular because it is the name of a magazine (targeted specifically at young girls) about horses and horse riding.

People

Business and politics
 Wendy Davis, American politician
 Wendi Deng, Chinese-born American businesswoman
 Wendy Morgan, Guernsey politician
 Wendy Thomas (born 1961), daughter of fast food chain Wendy's founder Dave Thomas and the company's namesake
 Wendy Thomas (politician) (born 1958 or 1959), New Hampshire state representative

Film, theatre, television, and radio
 Wendy Beckett (1930–2018), British religious sister and art historian
 Wendy Bergen (1956–2017), American television journalist
 Wendy Craig (born 1934), English actress
 Wendy Davis (born 1966), American actress 
 Wendy Greengross (1925–2012), English general practitioner and broadcaster
 Wendy Hiller (1912–2003), English actress
 Wendy Hoopes (born 1972), Malaysian American voice actress
 Wendy Kaufman (born 1958), American television personality
 Wendie Malick (born 1950), American actress and former fashion model
 Wendi McLendon-Covey (born 1969), American actress and comedian
 Wendy Mesley (born 1957), Canadian television journalist and reporter
 Wendy Morgan, English actress
 Wendy Morgan, Canadian film director
 Wendy Padbury (born 1947), English actress
 Wendi Peters (born 1968), English actress
 Wendy Phillips (born 1952), American actress 
 Wendy Richard (1943–2009), English actress
 Wendy Robie (born 1953), American actress 
 Wendy Raquel Robinson (born 1967), American actress
 Wendie Jo Sperber (1958–2005), American actress
 Wendy Schaal (born 1954), American actress 
 Wendy Stites (born 1949), Australian production and costume designer
 Wendy Tilby (born 1960), Canadian animator and director 
 Wendy Toye (1917–2010), English director and actress
 Wendy Williams (1934–2019), English actress
 Wendy Williams (born 1964), American television and radio presenter, businesswoman, author, actress and media personality
 Wendy O. Williams (1949-1998), American singer and former member of Plasmatics.

Sports
 Wendy Brown (heptathlete), American heptathlete
 Wendy Cruz, Dominican Republic cyclist
 Wendy Fuller, Canadian diver
 Wendy Holdener, Swiss alpine skier
 Wendy Lucero, American diver
 Wendie Renard, French football player
 Wendy Richter, American wrestler
 Wendy Vereen (born 1966), American former sprinter
 Wendy Weinberg, American Olympic medalist swimmer
 Wendy Wyland (1964-2003), American diver

Arts
 Wendy Bagwell (1925–1996), founding member and leader of the Southern gospel music and comedy trio Wendy Bagwell and the Sunliters
 Wendy Carlos, American composer
 Wendy Chung, Hong Kong pop and C-Pop lyricist
 Wendy Cope, English poet
 Wendy Davies, British professor of history
 Wendy J. Fox, American author
 Wendy Holden (author, born 1961), British journalist and author
 Wendy Holden (author, born 1965), British chick-lit novelist
 Wendy James, Transvision Vamp's singer
 Wendy Mass (born 1967), American author especially of young adult and children's novels
 Wendy Melvoin, musician and composer and twin sister of Susannah Melvoin
 Wendy Partridge, costume designer
 Wendy Pepper, fashion designer
 Wendy Pini, creator, artist and writer of the fantasy comic book universe Elfquest
 Wendy Shon, Korean singer and member of Red Velvet
 Wendy Sulca, Peruvian singer
 Wendy Wasserstein, American playwright
 Wendy Whelan, American ballet dancer and associate artistic director of New York City Ballet
 Wendy O. Williams, stripper turned punk rocker and leader of the Plasmatics
 Wendy Wilson, pop singer of Wilson Phillips fame and daughter of The Beach Boys singer, Brian Wilson
 Wendy Rose (born 1948), Hopi/Miwok writer.

Science and engineering
 Wendy Chung, geneticist
 Wendy Gibson, British professor in protozoology
 Wendy Lou (born 1962), Canadian statistician
 Wendy L. Martinez, American statistician
 Wendy Lee Queen (born 1981), American chemist and material scientist

Other
 Wendy Albano (died 2012), American woman who was murdered in Bangkok
 Wendy Fitzwilliam, Miss Universe 1998 from Trinidad and Tobago
 Wendy M. Masiello, United States Air Force officer 
 Wendy Metcalfe, Canadian journalist, editor and news executive
 Wendi Michelle Scott (born 1975), American criminal convicted of abusing her daughter in a case of Münchausen syndrome by proxy
 Wendy Osefo, Academic and The Real Housewives of Potomac cast member

Fictional characters
 Wendy Corduroy in Gravity Falls
 Wendy Harris in the Super Friends cartoon and comic book
 Wendy Johnson in My Parents are Aliens
 Wendy O. Koopa, one of the Koopalings in the Mario franchise
 Wendy Marvell in Fairy Tail
 Wendy Peyser in American Horror Story: Asylum
 Wendy Byrde in Ozark
 Wendy Testaburger in South Park
 Wendy Rhoades, wife of Chuck Rhoades and a psychiatrist/performance coach at Axe Capital in Showtime series Billions
 Winnifred "Wendy" Torrance, one of the main characters in Stephen King's The Shining
 Wendy Wu, the titular character of Wendy Wu: Homecoming Warrior
 Wendy the Good Little Witch in Harvey Comics
 Wendy, a character in Bob the Builder
 Wendy Wolf, a character in Peppa Pig
 Wendy, a playable character in the indie survival game Don't Starve and its sequel Don't Starve Together
 Wendy in How I Met Your Mother
 Wendy, a character in Bluey
 Wendy Darling in Peter Pan

References

English feminine given names
English given names invented by fiction writers